Paul Clayton Newell (born 23 February 1969) is an English former professional footballer who played as a goalkeeper.

Career
Newell made 147 appearances for Southend United, Leyton Orient, Colchester United, Barnet and Darlington in the Football League between the 1987–88 and 1996–97 seasons. He went on to play non-league football for clubs including Sittingbourne, St Albans City, Dagenham & Redbridge, Billericay Town, Hendon, Canvey Island, Aveley and Ford United, and was on the books of Northampton Town without playing for the first team.

Honours
Darlington
 Football League Third Division play-off runners-up: 1995–96

References

External links
Paul Newell at Soccerbase

1969 births
Living people
Footballers from Woolwich
English footballers
Association football goalkeepers
Southend United F.C. players
Leyton Orient F.C. players
Colchester United F.C. players
Barnet F.C. players
Darlington F.C. players
Sittingbourne F.C. players
Northampton Town F.C. players
St Albans City F.C. players
Dagenham & Redbridge F.C. players
Grays Athletic F.C. players
Billericay Town F.C. players
Canvey Island F.C. players
Aveley F.C. players
Redbridge F.C. players
English Football League players
Isthmian League players